Sargent is a surname of Latin (possibly Etruscan), early medieval English and Old French origin, and has also been used as a given name.

Background
The surname of Sargent in the various ways in which it is spelled is said to have come from the Latin phrase, "servientes armorum" (men discharging a military service) and therefore, soldiers ("Serjens d'Armes"); and "Serjiant of the Law" ("Serviens ad Legem") was also a term in very early use. The English translation of Serviens into Sargent did not appear until the reign of Henry III or Edward I. Today, the surname has many variant spellings ranging from Sargant, Sargeant and Seargeant to Sergant, Searjeant and Sergeaunt.

Surname
Notable people with the name include:

In arts and entertainment
Alvin Sargent (1927–2019), American screenwriter
Carl Sargent (born 1952), British author of role-playing games
Dick Sargent (1930–1994), American actor known for his role in Bewitched
Edward Sargent (architect) (1842–1914), American Architect
Frances Sargent Osgood (née Locke) (1811–1850), American poet
Henry Sargent (1770–1845), American painter and soldier
Herb Sargent (1923–2005), American television writer and producer
John Singer Sargent (1856–1925), portrait artist
Joseph Sargent (1925–2014), American film director
Judith Sargent Murray (1751–1820), American women's rights advocate and writer
Kenny Sargent, American musician and disc jockey
Kevin Sargent (composer), film and television composer
Lia Sargent, American voice actress
Malcolm Sargent (1895–1967), British conductor, organist and composer
Margaret Holland Sargent (born 1927), American portrait artist
Martin Sargent (born 1975), American television personality
Pamela Sargent (born 1948), American science fiction writer
 Richard Sargent (1911–1978), American illustrator
Robert F. Sargent, American war photographer
Roger Sargent (photographer) (born 1970), a British photographer
 G.F. Sargent, British painter

Politicians
Aaron A. Sargent (1827–1887) American journalist, lawyer, politician and diplomat
Eddie Sargent (1915–1998), Canadian politician
Francis W. Sargent (1915–1998), American politician
John Sargent (1715–1791), British Member of Parliament for West Looe and Midhurst
John Sargent (1750–1831), British Member of Parliament for Seaford, Bodmin and Queenborough
John Sargent (merchant) (1792–1874), Canadian merchant, farmer and politician
John Sargent (1799–1880), American politician
Trevor Sargent (born 1960), Irish politician
Winthrop Sargent (1753–1820), American politician

Scientists and engineers
Anneila Sargent (born 1942), Scottish–American astronomer
Bernice Weldon Sargent (1906–1993), Canadian physicist
Charles Sprague Sargent (1841–1927), American botanist
Oswald Hewlett Sargent (1880–1952), Australian botanist and plant collector
Roger Sargent (1926–2018), chemical engineer
Thomas J. Sargent (born 1943), American economist
Wallace L. W. Sargent (born 1935), British-American astronomer
Winifred Sargent (1905–1979), English mathematician
Edward H. Sargent, Canadian scientist

Soldiers
John Sargent (Loyalist) (1750–1824), Loyalist officer during the American Revolutionary War
John Neptune Sargent (1826–1893), commander of British troops in China, Hong Kong and the Straits Settlements
Paul Dudley Sargent (baptized 1745–died 1828), privateer and soldier in the Continental Army during the American Revolutionary War
Ruppert L. Sargent (1938–1967), American soldier

In sports
April Sargent, American figure skater
Bill Sargent (born 1907), American football coach
Danyelle Sargent (born ), American sports television reporter
Frank Sargent (sports executive) (1902–1988), a Canadian executive in ice hockey and curling
Gary Sargent (born 1954), Native American Hockey Player
George Sargent (golfer) (1882–1962), English golfer
James Sargent (born 1973), American hockey player
Kevin Sargent (American football) (born 1969), American football player
Josh Sargent (born 2000), American soccer player
Mark Sargent (born 1964), Australian rugby league footballer
Mekhi Sargent (born 1997), American football player
Mitchell Sargent (born 1979), Australian rugby league footballer
Murray Sargent (1928–2012), Australian cricketer

Other
Alonzo Sargent (1866–1942), American locomotive engineer
Ben Sargent (born 1948), American editorial cartoonist
C. B. R. Sargent (1906–1943), British educator and clergyman
Charlie Sargent, British criminal
Cornelia Sargent, lawyer, chair of the Albert Einstein Institution
Daniel Wycliffe Sargent (born 1850), British explorer
David Sargent (born 1929), American lawyer and academic
Dwight E. Sargent (1917–2002), American journalist
Frank P. Sargent (1854–1908), American trade union functionary
George Sargent (businessman) (1859–1921), Australian businessman
Henry Winthrop Sargent (1810–1882), American landscape gardener
Irene Sargent (1852–1932), American art historian
John G. Sargent (1860–1939), American lawyer and U.S. Attorney General
John Turner Sargent (born ), American publisher
Kevin Sargent, several people
Lucius Manlius Sargent (1786–1867), American author, antiquarian and temperance advocate
Lydia Sargent (born 1942), American feminist
Mark K. Sargent, American proponent of the flat Earth conspiracy theory
Sir Orme Sargent (1884–1962), British diplomat and civil servant
Shirley Sargent (1927–2004), American local historian

Fictional characters
John Sargent, alter ego of the DC Comics character Sargon the Sorcerer c. 1941His grandson David Sargent inherited this alter ego.
Joe Sargent, a bus driver in the horror novella The Shadow over Innsmouth by H.P. Lovecraft.

Given name
Sargent Kahanamoku (1910–1993), Native Hawaiian aquatic athlete
Robert Sargent Shriver (1915–2011), American politician and activist

See also
Sargant (surname)
Sergeant (surname)
Sergius (name)

References

English-language surnames
Occupational surnames
English-language occupational surnames